Eliava is a surname. Notable people with the surname include:

 Akaki Eliava, Georgian military officer
 George Eliava
 Lia Eliava, Georgian actress
 Shalva Eliava
 Zaali Eliava, Georgian footballer

See also
 George Eliava Institute

Georgian-language surnames